Pseudopostega sublobata is a moth of the family Opostegidae. It was described by Donald R. Davis and Jonas R. Stonis, 2007. It is known from Costa Rica and Ecuador.

The length of the forewings is 2.1–2.5 mm. Adults have been recorded over much of the year, from February to October in Costa Rica and during January in Ecuador.

Etymology
The species name is derived from the Latin sub (meaning under) and lobus (meaning a rounded projection or protuberance) in reference to the more slender gnathal lobe of the male, the distinguishing feature separating this species and Pseudopostega lobata.

References

Opostegidae
Moths described in 2007